Stefan Smiljanić (born 10 July 1991) is a Slovenian professional footballer who plays as a winger.

Club career
Smiljanić made his Olimpija Ljubljana debut on 12 September 2010 against Domžale. On 22 January 2011, he signed a four-year deal with Olimpija Ljubljana and was given the number 20 shirt. He has left Olimpija Ljubljana in January 2012 and joined on a six-month contract to Spanish lower league club UD Almansa. After his releasing in summer 2012 was four months without an club, before signed on 18 October 2012 for German side Hannover 96.

He then played with Greek side Doxa Drama, Serbian second-level side Jedinstvo Putevi, then with Dob in the Slovenian Second League, and in Autumn 2016 with Metalleghe-BSI.

In 2019, he joined FC Phönix Seen in Switzerland. In September 2019, he joined FC Kreuzlingen.

Personal life
Born in Subotica, SR Serbia, back then part of FR Yugoslavia, he moved to Slovenia as a 13-year boy from Belgrade, because his father, Blažko, got a job in University Medical Centre Ljubljana.

References

External links
 Stefan Smiljanić at PrvaLiga 
 Stefan Smiljanić at zerozero.pt

1991 births
Living people
Sportspeople from Subotica
Slovenian footballers
Association football wingers
Slovenian expatriate footballers
Expatriate footballers in Spain
Expatriate footballers in Greece
Expatriate footballers in England
Expatriate footballers in Germany
Expatriate footballers in Bosnia and Herzegovina
Expatriate footballers in Switzerland
Slovenian expatriate sportspeople in Spain
Slovenian expatriate sportspeople in Greece
Slovenian expatriate sportspeople in England
Slovenian expatriate sportspeople in Germany
Slovenian expatriate sportspeople in Switzerland
NK Olimpija Ljubljana (2005) players
Hannover 96 II players
Doxa Drama F.C. players
FK Jedinstvo Užice players
NK Dob players
NK Ankaran players
FC Kreuzlingen players
Slovenian PrvaLiga players
Serbian First League players